James Russell (born December 28, 1949) is a judge currently serving on the Federal Court of Canada.

References

1949 births
Living people
Judges of the Federal Court of Canada